The Notebooks of Malte Laurids Brigge, first published as Journal of My Other Self, is a 1910 novel by Austrian poet Rainer Maria Rilke. The novel was the only work of prose of considerable length that he wrote and published. It is semiautobiographical and is written in an expressionistic style, dealing with themes of alienation, unfamiliarity, death by illness, longing, childhood memories and the Parable of the Prodigal Son. It was conceptualized and written whilst Rilke lived in Paris, mainly inspired by Sigbjørn Obstfelder's A Priest's Diary and Jens Peter Jacobsen's Niels Lyhne.

English translations 

 John Linton (Norton, 1930; Hogarth Press, 1930). Originally published under the title The Journal of My Other Self.
 Mary D. Herter Norton (Norton, 1949)
 Stephen Mitchell (Random House, 1982)
 Burton Pike (Dalkey Archive, 2008)
 Michael Hulse (Penguin, 2009)
 Robert Vilain (Oxford, 2016)
 Edward Snow (Norton, 2022)

See also
Le Monde's 100 Books of the Century

References

External links 

English translation of Notebooks
 
Original text at zeno.org 

1910 German-language novels
Autobiographical novels
Austro-Hungarian culture
German-language novels
Works by Rainer Maria Rilke